Molelekwa is a surname. Notable people with the surname include:

Moses Taiwa Molelekwa (1973–2001), South African jazz pianist 
Sheillah Molelekwa (born 1992), Botswana beauty pageant titleholder

Surnames of African origin